The 1966 Stanley Cup Finals was the championship series of the National Hockey League's (NHL) 1965–66 season, and the culmination of the 1966 Stanley Cup playoffs. It was contested by the Detroit Red Wings and the defending champion Montreal Canadiens. The Canadiens won the best-of-seven series, four games to two, to win the Stanley Cup for the seventh time in eleven years.

Paths to the Finals
Montreal defeated the Toronto Maple Leafs 4–0 to advance to the finals, and Detroit defeated the Chicago Black Hawks 4–2.

Game summaries
With this series, Toe Blake had coached the Canadiens to seven Cups in eleven years. Henri Richard, a member of all seven championship teams, would score the series winner in game six in overtime.  Two minutes into the extra period, Richard broke in on Red Wing goalie Roger Crozier, lost his footing on the newly resurfaced ice as he cut across the goalmouth, and sprawled into Crozier.  The puck went in, and even though Crozier and the Wings protested that Richard had pushed the puck in with his hand, the goal stood.  His brilliant play in goal, even in defeat, earned Crozier the Conn Smythe Trophy as the most valuable player in the playoffs, becoming the first player to win the award as a member of the losing team.

Roger Crozier wins Conn Smythe Trophy.

Stanley Cup engraving
The 1966 Stanley Cup was presented to Canadiens captain Jean Beliveau by NHL President Clarence Campbell following the Canadiens 3–2 win over the Red Wings in game six.

The following Canadiens players and staff had their names engraved on the Stanley Cup

1965–66 Montreal Canadiens

Stanley Cup engravings
 Montreal Canadiens name was misspelt MONTREAL CANADIENE.  This mistake was later corrected on the Replica Cup created in 1992–93.

Broadcasting
In 1966, NBC became the first television network in the United States to air a national broadcast of a Stanley Cup Playoff game. The network provided coverage of four Sunday afternoon playoff games during the  postseason. On April 10 and April 17, NBC aired semifinal games between the Chicago Black Hawks and the Detroit Red Wings. On April 24 and May 1, NBC aired Games 1 and 4 of the Stanley Cup Finals between the Montreal Canadiens and the Detroit Red Wings. Win Elliot served as the play-by-play man while Bill Mazer served as the color commentator for the games.

NBC's coverage of the 1966 Stanley Cup Finals marked the first time that hockey games were broadcast on network television in color. The CBC would follow suit the following year. NBC's Stanley Cup coverage preempted a sports anthology series called NBC Sports in Action, hosted by Jim Simpson and Bill Cullen, who were between-periods co-hosts for the Stanley Cup broadcasts.

Aftermath
The next season, the Red Wings finished a distant fifth, 24 points out of the playoffs, marking the beginning of an almost 20 year slump known as the "Dead Wings" era. The Red Wings only made the playoffs twice in the next 16 years, and would not return to the Stanley Cup Finals again until 1995, where they were swept by the New Jersey Devils.

The Canadiens would return to the Stanley Cup Final the next season, but lost to the Toronto Maple Leafs in six games. However, the Canadiens would eventually become a dynasty, winning the Stanley Cup in 1968, 1969, 1971, 1973, 1976, 1977, 1978, and 1979.

See also
 1965–66 NHL season

Notes

References

 
 

Stanley Cup
Stanley Cup Finals
Detroit Red Wings games
Montreal Canadiens games
Ice hockey competitions in Montreal
Ice hockey competitions in Detroit
1966 in Detroit
Stanley Cup
Stanley Cup Finals
Stanley Cup Finals
Stanley Cup Finals
Stanley Cup Finals
1960s in Montreal
1966 in Quebec